Twilight is Future of Forestry's debut album released on Credential Recordings. It was released on January 23, 2007.

Track listing
 "Open Wide" – 3:55
 "All I Want" – 4:13
 "Twilight" – 4:55
 "Speak to Me Gently" – 4:09
 "Thinking of You" – 4:27
 "Sunrising" – 4:30
 "Sacred Place" – 3:43
 "You and I" – 4:44
 "Sanctitatis" – 4:30
 "If You Find Her" – 3:25
 "Gazing" – 4:13
 "Stay Beside Me/Hidden Track" – 14:01

Awards
In 2008, the album was nominated for a Dove Award for Rock Album of the Year at the 39th GMA Dove Awards.

References

Credential Recordings albums
2007 albums